Doshman Ziari Rural District is a rural district (dehestan) in Doshman Ziari District, Mamasani County, Fars Province, Iran. At the 2006 census, its population was 4,944, in 1,254 families.  The rural district has 30 villages.

References 

Rural Districts of Fars Province
Mamasani County